The Comorian Armed Forces are the national military of the Comoros. The armed forces consist of a small standing army and a 500-member police force, as well as a 500-member defense force. A defense treaty with France provides naval resources for protection of territorial waters, training of Comorian military personnel, and air surveillance. France maintains a small troop presence in the Comoros at government request. France maintains a small Navy base and a Foreign Legion Detachment (DLEM) in Mayotte.

Equipment inventory 
 FN FAL battle rifle
 AK-47 assault rifle
 Type 81 assault rifle
 NSV HMG
 RPG-7 anti-tank weapon
 Mitsubishi L200 pickup truck

Aircraft
Note: The last comprehensive aircraft inventory list was from Aviation Week & Space Technology in 2007.

References 

 
Government of the Comoros
Comoros